Lodi is a village in Seneca County, New York, United States. The population was 291 at the 2010 census.

The Village of Lodi is in the north part of the Town of Lodi and is northwest of Ithaca, New York. It owes its name to the Italian city of Lodi.

Lodi Point State Park is west of the village on the shore of Seneca Lake.

History
This part of New York was in the territory of the Seneca tribe until the Sullivan Expedition drove them away.  The area was then assigned to the Central New York Military Tract used to pay soldiers for service in the American Revolution.  The Lodi Methodist Church, designed by noted church architect Warren H. Hayes (1847–1899), was listed on the National Register of Historic Places in 1982.

Geography
Lodi is located at  (42.613366, -76.824082).

According to the United States Census Bureau, the village has a total area of 0.6 square miles (1.5 km2).None of the area is covered with water.

Lodi is in the Finger Lakes District of New York.

New York State Route 96A and New York State Route 414 intersect at the village.

Demographics

As of the census of 2010, there were 291 people, 118 households, and 81 families residing in the village. The population density was 485.0 people per square mile (194.0/km2). The racial makeup of the village was 97.6% White, 0.0% Black or African American, 0.7% Native American, 1.0% Asian, 0.0% Pacific Islander, 0.3% from other races, and 0.3% from two or more races. Hispanic or Latino of any race were 1.4% of the population.

There were 118 households, out of which 27.1% had children under the age of 18 living with them, 45.8% were married couples living together, 14.4% had a female householder with no husband present, and 31.4% were non-families. 27.1% of all households were made up of individuals, and 7.6% had someone living alone who was 65 years of age or older. The average household size was 2.47 and the average family size was 2.90.

In the village, the population was spread out, with 27.8% under the age of 20, 5.8% from 20 to 24, 24.4% from 25 to 44, 28.8% from 45 to 64, and 13.1% who were 65 years of age or older. The median age was 40.3 years. For every 100 females, there were 122.1 males. For every 100 females age 18 and over, there were 116.7 males.

The median income for a household in the village was $40,417, and the median income for a family was $52,500. Males had a median income of $31,250 versus $25,000 for females. The per capita income for the village was $19,108. About 21.2% of families and 19.5% of the population were below the poverty line, including 7.3% of those under age 18 and 22.9% of those age 65 or over.

Housing
There were 142 housing units at an average density of 236.7 per square mile (94.7/km2). 16.9% of housing units were vacant.

There were 118 occupied housing units in the village. 97 were owner-occupied units (82.2%), while 21 were renter-occupied (17.8%). The homeowner vacancy rate was 4.0% of total units. The rental unit vacancy rate was 0.0%.

References

External links
 Village of Lodi
 Visit Lodi NY
 Lodi Historical Society

Villages in New York (state)
Villages in Seneca County, New York